"Frederick" is a song written by Patti Smith, and released as lead single from Patti Smith Group 1979 album Wave. The song is dedicated to Fred "Sonic" Smith, guitar player of the Detroit band MC5 and Smith's future husband.

The melody of "Frederick" is a homage to Bruce Springsteen's live arrangement of "Prove It All Night" from the then-recent Darkness Tour of 1978.

Reception
Smash Hits said, "Patti has been getting a lot of stick from her original admirers for 'selling out' and going pop. I think they're being short-sighted (not to mention cloth-eared). This is an excellent sample of her new work with producer Todd Rundgren."

Covers
The song was covered by Sandie Shaw in 1986. The B-side was entitled "Go Johnny Go", and had been written by Shaw as a tribute to Johnny Marr.

Charts 
Patti Smith Group

References

External links 
 Frederick by Patti Smith Group at Discogs

1979 singles
1986 singles
Patti Smith songs
Sandie Shaw songs
Songs written by Patti Smith
Song recordings produced by Todd Rundgren
1979 songs
Arista Records singles